Pi Piscium (π Piscium) is a solitary, yellow-white hued star in the zodiac constellation of Pisces. It is faintly visible to the naked eye, having an apparent visual magnitude of 5.60. Based upon an annual parallax shift of 28.50 mas as seen from Earth, it is located about 1114 light years from the Sun. It is a member of the thin disk population of the Milky Way.

This is an ordinary F-type main-sequence star with a stellar classification of F0 V. At the estimated age of two billion years, it is about 55% of the way through its main sequence lifetime and still has a relatively high rate of spin with a projected rotational velocity of 105.9 km/s. The star has 1.5 times the mass of the Sun and is radiating 6.3 times the Sun's luminosity at an effective temperature of 6,850 K.

Naming

References

F-type main-sequence stars
Pisces (constellation)
Piscium, 102
Piscium, Pi
Durchmusterung objects
009919
007535
0463